The wild asses (Asinus) are a subgenus of single toed grazing ungulates. Its species are:
African wild ass Equus africanus
Nubian wild ass Equus africanus africanus (likely ancestor of the domestic donkey)
Somali wild ass Equus africanus somaliensis
Kiang (Tibetan wild ass, khyang, or gorkhar) Equus kiang
 Eastern kiang Equus kiang holdereri
 Southern kiang Equus kiang polyodon
 Western kiang Equus kiang kiang
Onager (Asiatic wild ass) Equus hemionus
Indian wild ass (khur), Equus hemionus khur
Mongolian wild ass (khulan), Equus hemionus hemionus
Persian onager (gur), Equus hemionus onager
Syrian wild ass (hemippe), Equus hemionus hemippus (extinct)
Turkmenian kulan (kulan), Equus hemionus kulan

Animal common name disambiguation pages